Preeti Nigam is an Indian actress who is known for her negative roles in Telugu-language television serials.

Career 
Her career began when a Telugu short filmmaker noticed her while she was giving a dance performance. The maker insisted that she star in his short film Aradhana although she wasn't fluent in Telugu. She garnered acclaim for her negative role in the Telugu television serial Kasturi as Sunila. Preeti went on to play negative roles in other serials including Chandramukhi on ETV and Swathi Chinukulu. She played supporting roles in several films including the Bollywood films Welcome to Sajjanpur (2008) and Well Done Abba (2009) before portraying the lead role of the revolutionary Chityala Ailamma in the film of the same name in 2013.

Personal life 
Her husband, Nagesh Karra, is also an actor. Their son Aryan Karra was selected to represent India in the World Roller Games in Barcelona (Spain) in 2019.

Filmography

Films 
All films are in Telugu, unless otherwise noted.

Television 
 All films are in Telugu, unless otherwise noted.

References

External links 

Actresses in Telugu television
Actresses in Telugu cinema
Actresses in Hindi cinema
Living people
Year of birth missing (living people)